The Shanghai Cooperation Organisation (SCO) is a Eurasian political, economic, International security and defence organization. It is the world's largest regional organization in terms of geographic scope and population, covering approximately 60% of the area of Eurasia, 40% of the world population, and more than 30% of global GDP.

The SCO is the successor to the Shanghai Five, formed in 1996 between the People's Republic of China, Kazakhstan, Kyrgyzstan, Russia, and Tajikistan. On 15 June 2001, the leaders of these nations and Uzbekistan met in Shanghai to announce a new organization with deeper political and economic cooperation; the SCO Charter was signed on 7 July 2002 and entered into force on 19 September 2003. Its membership has since expanded to eight states, with India and Pakistan joining on 9 June 2017. Several countries are engaged as observers or dialogue partners.

The SCO is governed by the Heads of State Council (HSC), its supreme decision-making body, which meets once a year.

Origins
The Shanghai Five group was created on 26 April 1996 with the signing of the Treaty on Deepening Military Trust in Border Regions in Shanghai by the heads of states of China, Kazakhstan, Kyrgyzstan, Russia and Tajikistan.

On 24 April 1997 the same countries signed the Treaty on Reduction of Military Forces in Border Regions in a meeting in Moscow, Russia. On 20 May 1997 Russian President Boris Yeltsin and Chinese President Jiang Zemin signed a declaration on a "multipolar world".

Subsequent annual summits of the Shanghai Five group occurred in Almaty, Kazakhstan in 1998, in Bishkek, Kyrgyzstan in 1999, and in Dushanbe, Tajikistan in 2000. At the Dushanbe summit, members agreed to "oppose intervention in other countries' internal affairs on the reason of 'humanitarianism' and 'protecting human rights;' and support the efforts of one another in safeguarding the five countries' national independence, sovereignty, territorial integrity, and social stability."

In 2001, the annual summit returned to Shanghai. There the five member nations first admitted Uzbekistan in the Shanghai Five mechanism (thus transforming it into the Shanghai Six). Then all six heads of state signed on 15 June 2001 the Declaration of Shanghai Cooperation Organisation, praising the role played thus far by the Shanghai Five mechanism and aiming to transform it to a higher level of cooperation.

In June 2002, the heads of the SCO member states met in Saint Petersburg, Russia. There they signed the SCO Charter which expounded on the organisation's purposes, principles, structures and forms of operation, and established it in international law.

In July 2005, at the summit in Astana, Kazakhstan, with representatives of India, Iran, Mongolia and Pakistan attending an SCO summit for the first time, Nursultan Nazarbayev, the president of the Kazakhstan, greeted the guests in words that had never been used before in any context: "The leaders of the states sitting at this negotiation table are representatives of half of humanity".

By 2007 the SCO had initiated over twenty large-scale projects related to transportation, energy and telecommunications and held regular meetings of security, military, defence, foreign affairs, economic, cultural, banking, and other officials from its member states.

In July 2015 in Ufa, Russia, the SCO decided to admit India and Pakistan as full members. Both signed the memorandum of obligations in June 2016 in Tashkent, Uzbekistan, thereby starting the formal process of joining the SCO as full members. On 9 June 2017, at a summit in Astana, India and Pakistan officially joined SCO as full members.

The SCO has established relations with the United Nations in 2004 (where it is an observer in the General Assembly), Commonwealth of Independent States in 2005, Association of Southeast Asian Nations (ASEAN) in 2005, the Collective Security Treaty Organization in 2007, the Economic Cooperation Organization in 2007, the United Nations Office on Drugs and Crime in 2011, the Conference on Interaction and Confidence-Building Measures in Asia (CICA) in 2014, and the United Nations Economic and Social Commission for Asia and the Pacific in 2015. SCO Regional Anti-Terrorist Structure (RATS) has established relations with the African Union's African Centre for the Study and Research on Terrorism (ACSRT) in 2018.

Organisational structure 

The Council of Heads of State is the top decision-making body in the SCO. This council meets at the SCO summits, which are held each year in one of the member states' capital cities. Because of their government structure, the prime ministers of the parliamentary democracies of India and Pakistan attend the SCO Council of Heads of State summits, as their responsibilities are similar to the presidents of other SCO nations. The current Council of Heads of State consists of:
 Xi Jinping (China)
 Narendra Modi (India)
 Kassym-Jomart Tokayev (Kazakhstan)
 Sadyr Japarov (Kyrgyzstan)
 Shehbaz Sharif (Pakistan)
 Vladimir Putin (Russia)
 Emomali Rahmon (Tajikistan)
 Shavkat Mirziyoyev (Uzbekistan)

The Council of Heads of Government is the second-highest council in the organisation. This council also holds annual summits, at which time members discuss issues of multilateral cooperation. The council also approves the organisation's budget. The current Council of Heads of Government consists of:
 Li Keqiang (China)
 Narendra Modi (India) (usually sends a deputy, such as EAM Subrahmanyam Jaishankar at the 2021 summit)
 Alihan Smaiylov (Kazakhstan)
 Akylbek Japarov (Kyrgyzstan)
 Shehbaz Sharif (Pakistan) (usually sends a deputy, such as Parliamentary Secretary for Foreign Affairs Andleeb Abbas at the 2020 summit)
 Mikhail Mishustin (Russia)
 Qohir Rasulzoda (Tajikistan)
 Abdulla Aripov (Uzbekistan)

The Council of Foreign Ministers also holds regular meetings, where they discuss the current international situation and the SCO's interaction with other international organisations.

The Council of National Coordinators coordinates the multilateral cooperation of member states within the framework of the SCO's charter.

The Secretariat of the SCO, headquartered in Beijing, China, is the primary executive body of the organisation. It serves to implement organisational decisions and decrees, drafts proposed documents (such as declarations and agendas), function as a document depository for the organisation, arranges specific activities within the SCO framework, and promotes and disseminates information about the SCO. The SCO Secretary-General is elected to a three-year term. The current Secretary-General is Zhang Ming of China, who assumed his office on 1 January 2022.

The Regional Anti-Terrorist Structure (RATS) Executive Committee, headquartered in Tashkent, Uzbekistan, is a permanent organ of the SCO which serves to promote cooperation of member states against the three evils of terrorism, separatism and extremism. The Director of SCO RATS Executive Committee is elected to a three-year term. The current Director is Ruslan Mirzaev of Uzbekistan, who assumed his office on 1 January 2022. Each member state also sends a permanent representative to RATS.

The official languages of the SCO are Chinese and Russian.

Membership

Member states

Observer states 

Afghanistan received observer status at the 2012 SCO summit in Beijing, China on 7 June 2012. No country has yet provided diplomatic recognition to the Taliban, and its representatives have not participated in SCO meetings so far. The Afghanistan head of state first attended the 2004 SCO summit as a guest attendee.

 
In 2008, Belarus applied for partner status in the organisation and was promised Kazakhstan's support towards that goal. However, Russian Defence Minister Sergei Ivanov voiced doubt on the probability of Belarus' membership, saying that Belarus was a purely European country. Despite this, at the 2009 SCO Summit in Yekaterinburg a decision was made to grant Belarus the dialogue partner status, which it officially received on 28 April 2010. After applying in 2012 for the observer status, Belarus received it in 2015. On 14 June 2022, Russia's Special Presidential Representative on SCO Affairs Bakhtiyor Khakimov confirmed that Belarus had applied for membership.

 
Iran has been an observer state since 2005. On 17 September 2021, the SCO launched the procedures of Iran's accession to the SCO, which are expected to take "a fair amount of time". On 15 September 2022, Iran signed a memorandum of obligations to join the SCO at the 2022 summit, and will join the organization subject to its parliament ratifying a number of agreements. On 27 November 2022, the Iranian parliament approved Iran's membership to the SCO.

 
Mongolia became the first country to receive observer status at the 2004 Tashkent Summit.

Pakistan, India and Iran received observer status at the 2005 SCO summit in Astana, Kazakhstan on 5 July 2005. India and Pakistan became full members of the Shanghai Cooperative Organization in 2017.

Dialogue partners 

The status of dialogue partner was created in 2008.

Guest attendances 
Multiple international organisations and one country are guest attendances to SCO summits.

Future membership possibilities 

In 2010, the SCO has approved a procedure for admitting new members.

Mongolia and Afghanistan, which have observer status, have stated their intention to become full SCO members.

In 2011, Turkey applied for dialogue partner status, which it obtained in 2013.

Turkish Prime Minister Recep Tayyip Erdoğan has stated that he has discussed the possibility of abandoning Turkey's candidacy of accession to the European Union in return for full membership in the Shanghai Cooperation Organisation. This was reinforced again on 21 November 2016, after the European Parliament voted unanimously to suspend accession negotiations with Turkey. Two days later, on 23 November 2016, Turkey was granted the chairmanship of SCO energy club for the 2017 period. That made Turkey the first country to chair a club in the organisation without full membership status. In 2022, Erdogan announced that Turkey would seek full SCO membership status.

In 2011, Vietnam expressed interest in obtaining observer status (but has not applied for it).

In 2012, Bangladesh applied for observer status.

In 2012, Ukraine expressed interest in obtaining observer status (but has not applied for it).

In 2015, Syria applied for dialogue partner status.

In 2016, Israel applied for dialogue partner status.

In 2019 or earlier, Iraq applied for dialogue partner status.

Turkmenistan has previously declared itself a permanently neutral country, which was recognized by a resolution adopted by the United Nations General Assembly, thus precluding its membership in the SCO. Turkmenistan head of state has been attending SCO summits since 2007 as a guest attendee.

Activities

Cooperation on security
The SCO is primarily centered on security-related concerns, often describing the main threats it confronts as being terrorism, separatism and extremism.

At SCO summit, held in Tashkent, Uzbekistan, on 16–17 June 2004, the Regional Anti-Terrorist Structure (RATS) was established. On 21 April 2006, the SCO announced plans to fight cross-border drug crimes under the counter-terrorism rubric.

In October 2007, the SCO signed an agreement with the Collective Security Treaty Organization (CSTO), in the Tajik capital of Dushanbe, to broaden cooperation on issues such as security, crime, and drug trafficking.

The organisation is also redefining cyberwarfare, saying that the dissemination of information "harmful to the spiritual, moral and cultural spheres of other states" should be considered a "security threat". An accord adopted in 2009 defined "information war", in part, as an effort by a state to undermine another's "political, economic, and social systems". The Diplomat reported in 2017 that SCO has foiled 600 terror plots and extradited 500 terrorists through RATS. The 36th meeting of the Council of the RATS decided to hold a joint anti-terror exercise, Pabbi-Antiterror-2021, in Pakistan in 2021.

Military activities

Over the past few years, the organisation's activities have expanded to include increased military cooperation, intelligence sharing, and counterterrorism.

Military exercises are regularly conducted among members to promote cooperation and coordination against terrorism and other external threats, and to maintain regional peace and stability. There have been a number of SCO joint military exercises. The first of these was held in 2003, with the first phase taking place in Kazakhstan and the second in China. Since then China and Russia have teamed up for large-scale war games in Peace Mission 2005, Peace Mission 2007 and Peace Mission 2009, under the auspices of the Shanghai Cooperation Organisation. More than 4,000 soldiers participated at the joint military exercises in Peace Mission 2007, which took place in Chelyabinsk, Russia near the Ural Mountains, as was agreed upon in April 2006 at a meeting of SCO Defence Ministers. Russian Defence Minister Sergei Ivanov said that the exercises would be transparent and open to media and the public. Following the war games' successful completion, Russian officials began speaking of India joining such exercises in the future and the SCO taking on a military role. Peace Mission 2010, conducted 9–25 September at Kazakhstan's Matybulak training area, saw over 5,000 personnel from China, Russia, Kazakhstan, Kyrgyzstan and Tajikistan conduct joint planning and operational maneuvers.

The SCO has served as a platform for larger military announcements by members. During the 2007 war games in Russia, with leaders of SCO member states in attendance including Chinese President Hu Jintao, Russia's President Vladimir Putin used the occasion to take advantage of a captive audience. Russian strategic bombers, he said, would resume regular long-range patrols for the first time since the Cold War. "Starting today, such tours of duty will be conducted regularly and on the strategic scale", Putin said. "Our pilots have been grounded for too long. They are happy to start a new life".

On 4 June 2014, in the Tajik capital Dushanbe, the idea was brought up to merge the SCO with the Collective Security Treaty Organization. However in the wake of Russia's invasion of Ukraine in 2022, many SCO and even CSTO members have distanced themselves from military cooperation with Russia.

At the same time, leaders of SCO states have repeatedly stated that the SCO is not a military alliance.

Economic cooperation
Russia, Kazakhstan and Kyrgyzstan are also members of the Eurasian Economic Union.

A Framework Agreement to enhance economic cooperation was signed by the SCO member states on 23 September 2003. At the same meeting the Premier of China, Wen Jiabao, proposed a long-term objective to establish a free trade area in the SCO, while other more immediate measures would be taken to improve the flow of goods in the region. A follow up plan with 100 specific actions was signed one year later, on 23 September 2004.

On 26 October 2005, during the Moscow Summit of the SCO, the Secretary General of the Organisation said that the SCO will prioritise joint energy projects; including in the oil and gas sector, the exploration of new hydrocarbon reserves, and joint use of water resources. The creation of the SCO Interbank Consortium was also agreed upon at that summit in order to fund future joint projects. The first meeting of the SCO Interbank Association was held in Beijing on 21–22 February 2006. On 30 November 2006, at The SCO: Results and Perspectives, an international conference held in Almaty, the representative of the Russian Foreign Ministry announced that Russia is developing plans for an SCO "Energy Club". The need for this "club" was reiterated by Moscow at an SCO summit in November 2007. Other SCO members, however, have not committed themselves to the idea. However, during the 2008 summit it was stated that "Against the backdrop of a slowdown in the growth of world economy pursuing a responsible currency and financial policy, control over the capital flowing, ensuring food and energy security have been gaining special significance".

At the 2007 SCO summit Iranian Vice President Parviz Davoodi addressed an initiative that had been garnering greater interest and assuming a heightened sense of urgency when he said, "The Shanghai Cooperation Organisation is a good venue for designing a new banking system which is independent from international banking systems".

The address by President Putin also included these comments:
We now clearly see the defectiveness of the monopoly in world finance and the policy of economic selfishness. To solve the current problem Russia will take part in changing the global financial structure so that it will be able to guarantee stability and prosperity in the world and to ensure progress.

The world is seeing the emergence of a qualitatively different geo-political situation, with the emergence of new centers of economic growth and political influence.

We will witness and take part in the transformation of the global and regional security and development architectures adapted to new realities of the 21st century, when stability and prosperity are becoming inseparable notions.

On 16 June 2009, at the Yekaterinburg Summit, China announced plans to provide a US$10 billion loan to other SCO member states to shore up the struggling economies of its members amid the global financial crisis. The summit was held together with the first BRIC summit, and the China–Russia joint statement said that they want a bigger quota in the International Monetary Fund.

During 2019 Bishkek summit, Pakistani Prime Minister Imran Khan has suggested taking steps to trade in local currencies instead of U.S. dollars and setting up financial institutions including an SCO bank.

In June 2022, Iran's Deputy Foreign Minister for Economic Diplomacy Mehdi Safari has suggested creating a single SCO currency to facilitate trade and financial transactions among SCO members.

During 19–22 October 2022, Iran will host SCOCOEX, an international conference and exhibition on economic cooperation opportunities available to the SCO member states and partners.

Cultural cooperation 
Cultural cooperation also occurs in the SCO framework. Culture ministers of the SCO met for the first time in Beijing on 12 April 2002, signing a joint statement for continued cooperation. The third meeting of the Culture Ministers took place in Tashkent, Uzbekistan, on 27–28 April 2006.

An SCO Arts Festival and Exhibition was held for the first time during the Astana Summit in 2005. Kazakhstan has also suggested an SCO folk dance festival to take place in 2008, in Astana.

Summits
According to the Charter of the SCO, summits of the Council of Heads of State shall be held annually at alternating venues. The locations of these summits follow the alphabetical order of the member state's name in Russian. The charter also dictates that the Council of Heads of Government (that is, the Prime Ministers) shall meet annually in a place decided upon by the council members. The Council of Foreign Ministers is supposed to hold a summit one month before the annual summit of Heads of State. Extraordinary meetings of the Council of Foreign Ministers can be called by any two member states.

List of summits

Analysis

Relations with the West

The United States applied for observer status in the SCO, but was rejected in 2005.

At the Astana summit in July 2005, with the wars in Afghanistan and Iraq foreshadowing an indefinite presence of U.S. forces in Uzbekistan and Kyrgyzstan, the SCO requested the U.S. to set a clear timetable for withdrawing its troops from SCO member states. Shortly afterwards, Uzbekistan requested the U.S. to leave the K2 air base.

A report in 2007 noted that the SCO has made no direct comments against the U.S. or its military presence in the region; however, some indirect statements at the past summits have been viewed by Western media outlets as "thinly veiled swipes at Washington".

Geopolitical aspects

There have been many discussions and commentaries about the geopolitical nature of the Shanghai Cooperation Organisation. Matthew Brummer, in the Journal of International Affairs, tracks the implications of SCO expansion into the Persian Gulf. Also, according to political scientist Thomas Ambrosio, one aim of SCO was to ensure that liberal democracy could not gain ground in these countries. Political scientist Thomas Fingar writes that China took the lead in establishing the Shanghai Five primarily to limit Russia's ability to reassert its influence in Central Asia.

Iranian writer Hamid Golpira had this to say on the topic: "According to Zbigniew Brzezinski's theory, control of the Eurasian landmass is the key to global domination and control of Central Asia is the key to control of the Eurasian landmass....Russia and China have been paying attention to Brzezinski's theory, since they formed the Shanghai Cooperation Organisation in 2001, ostensibly to curb extremism in the region and enhance border security, but most probably with the real objective of counterbalancing the activities of the United States and the rest of the NATO alliance in Central Asia".

At a 2005 summit in Kazakhstan the SCO issued a Declaration of Heads of Member States of the Shanghai Cooperation Organisation which addressed their "concerns" and contained an elaboration of the organisation's principles. It included: "The heads of the member states point out that, against the backdrop of a contradictory process of globalisation, multilateral cooperation, which is based on the principles of equal right and mutual respect, non-intervention in internal affairs of sovereign states, non-confrontational way of thinking and consecutive movement towards democratisation of international relations, contributes to overall peace and security, and call upon the international community, irrespective of its differences in ideology and social structure, to form a new concept of security based on mutual trust, mutual benefit, equality and interaction."

In November 2005 Russian Foreign Minister Sergey Lavrov reiterated that the "Shanghai Cooperation Organisation (SCO) is working to establish a rational and just world order" and that "The Shanghai Cooperation Organisation provides us with a unique opportunity to take part in the process of forming a fundamentally new model of geopolitical integration".

The People's Daily expressed the matter in these terms: "The Declaration points out that the SCO member countries have the ability and responsibility to safeguard the security of the Central Asian region, and calls on Western countries to leave Central Asia. That is the most noticeable signal given by the Summit to the world".

In January 2023, India as SCO chair, invited Pakistan's Foreign Affairs Minister and Chief justice to attend a meeting in Goa in May 2023.

Human rights issues

In the December 2015 United Nations General Assembly vote, all six members of the SCO voted against the overall human rights situation in Iran, expressing concern not only about religious persecution but also the government's frequent use of the death penalty, failure to uphold legal due process, restrictions on freedom of expression, and ongoing discrimination against women and ethnic minorities.

In July 2019, five of the eight SCO members were among the 50 countries that backed China's policies in Xinjiang, signing a joint letter to the UNHRC commending China's "remarkable achievements in the field of human rights", claiming "Now safety and security has returned to Xinjiang and the fundamental human rights of people of all ethnic groups there are safeguarded. By June 2020, four of the eight SCO members were among the 53 countries that backed the Hong Kong national security law at the United Nations.

Other analysis 
A 2015 European Parliamentary Research Service paper concludes, "The SCO's main achievement thus far is to have offered its members a cooperative forum to balance their conflicting interests and to ease bilateral tensions. It has built up joint capabilities and has agreed on common approaches in the fight against terrorism, separatism and extremism. However, major shortcomings, such as institutional weaknesses, a lack of common financial funds for the implementation of joint projects and conflicting national interests have prevented the SCO from achieving a higher level of regional cooperation in other areas."

Current leaders of member states

See also 

 Asia Cooperation Dialogue
 Asia–Europe Meeting
 Belt and Road Initiative
 Collective Security Treaty Organization
 Conference on Interaction and Confidence-Building Measures in Asia
 Eurasian Economic Union
 Eurasianism
 China–Russia relations
 Association of Southeast Asian Nations 
 South Asian Association for Regional Cooperation

Notes

References

Further reading

 Adıbelli, Barış (2006). "Greater Eurasia Project". Istanbul: IQ Publishing House.
 Adıbelli, Barış (2007). Turkey–China Relations since the Ottoman Period. Istanbul: IQ Publishing House.
 Adıbelli, Barış (2007). The Shanghai Cooperation Organisation Dream of Turkey. Istanbul: Cumhuriyet Strateji.
 Adıbelli, Barış (2007). The Eurasia Strategy of China. Istanbul: IQ Publishing House.
 Adıbelli, Barış (2008). The Great Game in Eurasian Geopolitics. Istanbul: IQ Publishing House.
 Chabal, Pierre (2019), La coopération de Shanghai : conceptualiser la nouvelle Asie, Presses de l'Université de Liège, 308 p; 2019 – Presses Universitaires de Liège – La coopération de Shanghai 
 Chabal, Pierre (2016), L'Organisation de Coopération de Shanghai et la construction de "la nouvelle Asie", Brussels: Peter Lang, 492 p.
 Chabal, Pierre (2015), Concurrences Interrégionales Europe-Asie au 21ème siècle, Brussels: Peter Lang, 388 p.
 Cohen, Dr. Ariel. (18 July 2001). "The Russia-China Friendship and Cooperation Treaty: A Strategic Shift in Eurasia?". The Heritage Foundation.
 Cohen, Dr. Ariel. (24 October 2005). "Competition over Eurasia: Are the U.S. and Russia on a Collision Course?". The Heritage Foundation.
 Colson, Charles. (5 August 2003). "Central Asia: Shanghai Cooperation Organisation Makes Military Debut". Radio Free Europe/Radio Liberty.
 Daly, John. (19 July 2001). "'Shanghai Five' expands to combat Islamic radicals". Jane's Terrorism & Security Monitor.
 Douglas, John Keefer; Matthew B. Nelson, and Kevin Schwartz;  , United States–China Economic and Security Review Commission, October 2006.
 Fels, Enrico (2009), Assessing Eurasia's Powerhouse. An Inquiry into the Nature of the Shanghai Cooperation Organisation, Winkler Verlag: Bochum. 
 Gill, Bates and Oresman, Matthew, China's New Journey to the West: Report on China's Emergence in Central Asia and Implications for U.S. Interests, CSIS Press, August 2003
 Kalra, Prajakti and Saxena, Siddharth "Shanghai Cooperation Organisation and Prospects of Development in Eurasia Region" Turkish Policy Quarterly, Vol 6. No. 2, 2007
 Plater-Zyberk, Henry; Monaghan, Andrew (2014). Strategic Implications of the Evolving Shanghai Cooperation Organization. Strategic Studies Institute and U.S. Army War College Press.
 Oresman, Matthew,  , National Defence University Press, August 2004
 Sznajder, Ariel Pablo, "China's Shanghai Cooperation Organisation Strategy", University of California Press, May 2006
 Yom, Sean L. (2002). "Power Politics in Central Asia: The Future of the Shanghai Cooperation Organisation". Harvard Asia Quarterly 6 (4) 48–54.

External links

 

 
1996 establishments in Asia
Organizations established in 1996
Intergovernmental organizations established by treaty
International military organizations
International organizations based in Asia
Chinese economic policy
United Nations General Assembly observers
China–India relations
China–Pakistan relations
China–Russia relations
India–Russia relations
Kazakhstan–Kyrgyzstan relations
Kazakhstan–Russia relations
Kazakhstan–Uzbekistan relations
Kyrgyzstan–Russia relations
Kyrgyzstan–Tajikistan relations
Kyrgyzstan–Uzbekistan relations
Pakistan–Russia relations
Russia–Tajikistan relations
Russia–Uzbekistan relations
Tajikistan–Uzbekistan relations
Multilateral relations of China
Multilateral relations of Pakistan
Multilateral relations of Russia
China–India military relations
India–Pakistan relations
India–Pakistan military relations
India–Kazakhstan relations
India–Kyrgyzstan relations
India–Tajikistan relations
India–Uzbekistan relations